Ruby Florence Murray (29 March 1935 – 17 December 1996) was a Northern Irish singer. One of the most popular singers in the British Isles in the 1950s, she scored ten hits in the UK Singles Chart between 1954 and 1959. She also made pop chart history in March 1955 by having five hits in the Top Twenty in a single week.

Child star
Ruby Florence Murray was born near the Donegall Road in south Belfast, the youngest child in a Protestant family. She had surgery at six weeks of age due to swollen glands, and as a result, had a very husky voice. Entering a public speaking contest run by Eglinton Young Farmers Club, Londonderry in March 1947, she won a special prize for the youngest competitor under 18. A performance at the Ballymena Variety Theatre in February 1948 received a wonderful reception and she then toured in Northern Ireland as a child singer. Murray first appeared on television at the age of 12, having been spotted by producer Richard Afton. Owing to laws governing children performing, Murray had to delay her start in the entertainment industry. She returned to Belfast and full-time education until she was 14.

Chart success
Murray kept busy on the variety stage in Northern Ireland in the early 1950s and in 1954 she joined a touring revue called "Yankee Doodle Blarney" which gave her very useful exposure on the English variety stages. Richard Afton offered her the position of resident singer on the BBC's Quite Contrary television show, to replace Joan Regan. After being again spotted by Ray Martin on the first "Quite Contrary" show, Murray was signed to Columbia and her first single, "Heartbeat", reached No. 3 in the UK Singles Chart in December 1954. "Softly, Softly", her second single, reached number one in early 1955. That same year Murray set a pop chart record by having five hits in the Top Twenty in one week, a feat unmatched for many years. In 2014, the Guinness Book of World Records issued three certificates confirming that at the date of issue, nobody had beaten this record, although it was shared with three other singers.  The record by a female singer still stands at the date of 26 February 2019.

The 1950s was a busy period for Murray, during which she had her own television show, starred at the London Palladium with Norman Wisdom, appeared in a Royal Command Performance (1955), and toured the world. In a period of 52 weeks, starting on 3 December 1954 and lasting until the end of November 1955, Murray constantly had at least one single in the UK charts – this at a time when only a Top 20 was listed.

Murray appeared in her only film role, as Ruby, in A Touch of the Sun, a 1956 farce with Frankie Howerd and Dennis Price. A couple of hits followed later in the decade; "Goodbye Jimmy, Goodbye", a No. 10 hit in 1959, was her final appearance in the charts.
EMI put together a compilation album of her hits on CD in 1989, including songs that regularly featured in her act; "Mr. Wonderful", "Scarlet Ribbons" and "It's the Irish in Me". They updated this with the release of EMI Presents The Magic of Ruby Murray in 1997 and a four CD album, Anthology – The Golden Anniversary Collection, in 2005, the 50th anniversary of her peak successes on the charts.

Legacy
Murray's popularity led to her name being adopted in Cockney rhyming slang as a rhyme for "curry". The phrase "have a ruby" appears in various episodes of the BBC TV comedy series Only Fools and Horses.

A play about Murray's life, Ruby, written by the Belfast playwright Marie Jones, opened at the Group Theatre in Belfast in April 2000.  A second play, by Michael Cameron, opened in Belfast on 13 February 2019 and was sold out at all performances.

Personal life
In 1957, while working in Blackpool, Murray met Bernie Burgess, a member of a successful television and recording vocal quartet, the Four Jones Boys. Shortly afterwards she left Northern Ireland to marry him and live with him in Northampton. Burgess, contrary to press reports, did not become her manager, but rather his role was that of a supporting husband. The couple included a song-and-dance segment in Murray's act during the 1960s.

Murray struggled with alcoholism for most of her life and this contributed to the breakdown of her marriage in 1974. The divorce was finalised in 1976 and Murray moved to Torquay to live with an old friend, Ray Lamar, a former stage dancer and theatre impresario, who was 18 years her senior. They married in 1991 and spent the evening with a small party of friends and family at an Italian restaurant in Babbacombe.

Murray had two children from her marriage to Burgess, Julie (b. 1960) and Tim (b. 1965). Tim died unexpectedly from a heart condition in July 2020, aged 55.

Although her days as a major star were long over, Murray continued performing until close to the end of her life. Spending her last couple of years in Asprey's Nursing Home, she often delighted her carers with a song, and was visited by her friend Max Bygraves. She died of liver cancer on 17 December 1996, aged 61.

Ray Lamar died on 3 August 2005 from complications of pneumonia, aged 87.

Singles discography
 "Heartbeat" (1954) – UK number 3
 "Softly, Softly" (1955) – UK number 1
 "Happy Days and Lonely Nights" (1955) – UK number 6
 "Let Me Go Lover" (1955) – UK number 5
 "If Anyone Finds This, I Love You" (1955) – UK number 4 †
 "Evermore" (1955) – UK number 3
 "I'll Come When You Call" (1955) – UK number 6
 "The Very First Christmas of All" (1955) – UK number 9 (Record Mirror)
 "You are My First Love" (1956) – UK number 16
 "Real Love" (1958) – UK number 18
 "Goodbye Jimmy, Goodbye" (1959) – UK number 10

† Ruby Murray with Anne Warren

For further discography, see this page on the official Ruby Murray website.

See also
 List of artists who reached number one on the UK Singles Chart
 List of Northern Irish people
 Culture of Northern Ireland
 List of Belfast people

References

External links
 Official website
 Short biography 45rpm.org.uk
 BBC recording of interview in 1956 

1935 births
1996 deaths
Musicians from Belfast
20th-century women singers from Northern Ireland
Deaths from liver cancer
Deaths from cancer in England
Pop singers from Northern Ireland
Presbyterians from Northern Ireland